Your Choice Records was a German independent record label that was founded in 1988 by producer Tobby Holzinger. The label specialized in independent punk music, including live releases of German and other international acts. Holzinger provided a share of the record sale profit to various animal rights organisations.

The label maintained a strict DIY ethic, producing all of its albums by itself and selling them at discount prices without the help of major distributors.

Your Choice Records existed in the early days of hardcore, inspired by the spirit of labels like Dischord Records, Alternative Tentacles, SST Records and Touch and Go Records. Early releases by Your Choice were relatively well-produced compared to other punk live recordings of the time.

Roster
Bands such as So Much Hate, Ripcord, Life... But How To Live It?, Verbal Assault, Arm, Target of Demand, Raped Teenagers, Pullermann, Kina, Scream, NoNoYesNo, Melvins, Neurosis, Steel Pole Bath Tub, Party Diktator, Wasteland, Helios Creed, The Notwist, Shudder to Think, Articles of Faith, Leatherface, Jawbox, Poison Idea, Hard-Ons, Lars Holzapfel, Wool, Samiam, Plexus, Headroom, Overdose, Girls Against Boys, Texas Is the Reason and The (International) Noise Conspiracy have released records on Your Choice.

Band / Year / Line-up 

 So Much Hate (1988) - Line up: PER ARNE-BASS, BØRRE-GUITAR, GUNNAR-VOCALS, FINN ERIK-DRUMS
 Ripcord (1988) - Line up: JIM-BASS, BAZ-GUITAR, STEVE-VOCALS, JOHN-DRUMS
 Life... But How To Live It? (1989) - Line up: ROGER-GUITAR, KATJA-VOCALS, TOM-BASS, DYRET-DRUMS
 Verbal Assault (1989) - Line up: DOUGH-DRUMS, CHRIS-VOCALS, PETE-GUITAR, DARREN-BASS
 Arm (1989) - Line up: DANIELLE-VOCALS, MARKUS-GUITARS, STEPHAN-DRUMS, UWE-BASS, TOM-SOUNDMASTER
 Target of Demand (1989) - Line up: JOHNNY-BASS, MOPS-GUITAR, RAINER-VOCALS, HUCKEY-DRUMS, PETERL-SUPPORT
 Raped Teenagers (1989) - Line up: PARTIK-GUITAR, PETER-DRUMS, OLA-BASS
 Pullermann (1989) - Line up: JÖRG-GUITAR, CYBELLE-VOCALS, TOBIAS-BASS, STEPHAN-DRUMS, S.A.M.-VOCALS
 Kina (1990) - Line up: SERGIO-DRUMS / VOCALS, ALBERTO-GUITARS / VOCALS, GIANPIERO-BASS / VOCALS
 Scream (1990) - Line up: FRANZ-GUITARS, SKEETER-BASS, PETER-VOCALS, DAVID-DRUMS, ANNOUNCER-JOSEF KLUMB
 NoNoYesNo (1991) - Line up: CLOAT-OINK, CONSTANTIN-BRAVOMAT, DALIBOR-SCHLÄGER, EMMO WEBER-MINISTER OF DRUNKENNESS, FRANK BLUME-MINISTER OF TRAFFIC, SASCHA-SCHOPPING, TOBBY-MELVIN, TOMASSO-KNÖDEL
 Melvins (1991) - Line up: LORAX-BASS, KINGBUZZO-VOCALS / GUITAR, DALEDOE-DRUMS / VOCALS
 Neurosis (1992) - Line up: JASON JAMES-DRUMS, DAVE EDWARDSON-VOICE/BASS, SCOTT KELLY-VOICE/GUITAR, STEVE VON TILL-GUITAR
 Steel Pole Bath Tub (1991 / 1992) - Line up: DALE FLATTUM-BASS/VOC., DARREN MIR-X - DRUMS, MIKE MALESTEEN-G./VOC.
 Party Diktator (1992) - Line up: MATTHIAS-BASS, OLE-GUITAR, POPEL-DRUMS, NIC-THROAT
 Samiam (1992 / 1996) - Line up: SERGIE LOOBKOFF-GUITAR, JAMES BROGAN-GUITAR, JASON BEEBOUT-VOCALS, AARON RUBIN-BASS, MP-DRUMS
 Articles of Faith (1992) - Line up: VIRUS X - DRUMS, DAVE SHIELD - BASS / VOC., JOE SCUDARI - GUIT., DORIAN TASKBASKSH - GUIT., VIC BONDI - VOC. / GUIT.
 Leatherface (1993) - Line up: ANDREW LAING - DRUMS, ANDREW CRIGHTON - BASS, DICKIE HAMMOND - GUITAR, FRANKIE STUBBS - VOCALS / GUITAR
 Poison Idea (1993) - Line up: JERRY A. - VOCALS, THEE SLAYER HIPPY - DRUMS, MONDO - GUITAR, MYRTLE TICKNER - BASS
 Wasteland (1993) - Line up: BJØRN, KARL, KÖPPE
 Helios Creed (1993) - Line up: HELIOS CREED-GUIT./VOC., CHRIS Mc KAY-BASS, PAUL DELLA PELLE-DRUMS, Z SILVER-SYNTHS/SAMPS
 Girls Against Boys (1993) - Line up: ELI JANNEY-NO.2 VOC., BASS, KEYBOARD, JOHNNY TEMPLE-BASS, SCOTT McCLOUD-NO.1 VOC., GUITAR, ALEXIS FLEISIG-DRUMS
 The Notwist (1994) - Line up: MICHA ACHER - BASS, MARKUS ACHER - GUITAR / VOCALS, MECKY MESSERSCHMIDT - DRUMS
 Shudder to Think (1994) - Line up: STUART HILL-BASS, NATHAN LARSON-GUITAR, MIKE RUSSELL-DRUMS, CRAIG WEDREN-VOC./GUIT
 Jawbox (1994) - Line up: GUITAR / "VOICE" - J.ROBBINS, GUITAR / OTHER VOICE - W.C.*DB BARBOT, BASS GUITAR - KIM COLETTA, DRUMS - LOVEY
 Hard-Ons (1994) - Line up: RAY -BASS, BLACKIE - GUITARS / VOCALS, KEISH - VOCALS / DRUMS
 Lars Holzapfel (1995) - Line up: LARS HOLZAPFEL
 Wool (1995) - Line up: PETE STAHL - VOCALS / GUITAR, FRANZ STAHL - GUITAR / VOCALS, AL BLOCH - BASS / VOCALS, CHRIS BRATTON- DRUMS
 Plexus (1995) - Line up: D.V/D ELSKEN - DRUMS, VOC., SLIDE GUITAR, B.WARNING - GUITAR, LEAD VOC., J.BIJLEVELD - BASSGUITAR
 Headroom (1996) - Line up: PATRICK-GUITARS/VOCALS, THEISEN-DRUMS, WILLIAM-B, PETE-VOCALS
 Overdose (1996) - Line up: ROBBY ALBRECHT-GUITARS, OLIVER SCHULZE-HERGEL-BASS, JÖRG MUDERS-DRUMS
 Texas is the Reason (1996) - Line up: GERRET KLAHN-VOCALS/GUITAR, CHRIS DALY-DRUMS, SCOT WINEGARD-BASS, NORM ARENAS-GUITAR
 The (International) Noise Conspiracy (2002) Line up: DENNIS LYXZÉN-VOCALS, SARA ALMGREN-GUITAR, KEYBOARD, LUDWIG DAHLBERG-DRUMS, INGE JOHANSSON-BASS, LARS STRÖMBERG-GUITAR, VOCALS

Opinions

Gallery

See also 
 It's Your Choice - compilation
 Your Choice Live Series Vol.03
 Your Choice Live Series Vol.10
 Your Choice Live Series Vol.12
 Your Choice Live Series Vol.19
 Your Choice Live Series Vol.20
 Your Choice Live Series Vol.22
 Your Choice Live Series Vol.25
 Your Choice Live Series Vol.37
 Your Choice Records - the 7 inches - compilation

References

External links
 Your Choice Records - Official site
 List of Your Choice Records releases

German independent record labels
Record labels established in 1988
Post-hardcore record labels
Punk record labels
Hardcore record labels
Indie rock record labels
Companies based in Aachen